William Rea Furlong (May 26, 1881 – June 2, 1976) was United States Navy Rear admiral during World War II, who served as the Chief of Naval Ordnance from 1937 to 1941. After Japanese Attack on Pearl Harbor, Furlong was tasked with the salvaging and repairing of the sunken U.S. ships.

Early years

William Rea Furlong was born on May 26, 1881, in the town of Allenport, Pennsylvania, as a son of William Allen Furlong and Ethel Grant Furlong. Furlong attended the Normal School in California, Pennsylvania, where he earned his teaching degree. He subsequently worked as a teacher for almost two years. In 1901, he was recommended for the United States Naval Academy at Annapolis, Maryland. Furlong graduated in 1905 with the rank of ensign and was assigned to the armored cruiser  until 1909.

In 1910, Furlong was assigned to the protected cruiser , which was posted as the reserve of the Massachusetts Naval Militia. He briefly commanded the cruiser from August 19 to the 29th in 1910.  He served on Chicago until 1912, when he attended the Columbia University, New York and graduated with the Master of Science degree in electrical and radio engineering in 1914.

Furlong was then assigned as fleet radio officer and aide on the staff of the commander-in-chief, United States Atlantic Fleet.  In April 1914, he participated in the Veracruz Expedition in Mexico. In July he was assigned as the Fleet Radio Officer on board the battleship USS New York.

World War I

After his graduation, Furlong was appointed a fleet radio officer and aide on the staff of the commander-in-chief, United States Atlantic Fleet under the command of Admiral Frank Friday Fletcher.

Furlong the served as gunnery observer on the battleship USS New York, operating in European waters and as  gunnery observer in the war zone with the British Grand Fleet.

In March 1918 he was assigned to the Bureau of Ordnance.

Interwar period
Following the war, Furlong served from 1919 to 1920 as Chief of Fire Control Section, Bureau of Ordnance, Navy Department, Washington D.C. where he introduced synchronous fire control system and remote control of guns by electrical power.

From 1921 to 1923 he served as an aide on the staff and fleet gunnery officer to the commander-in-chief, United States Pacific Fleet.  This was followed by an assignment from 1923 to 1926 where he served in office of the Chief of Naval Operations, Navy Department, Washington, D.C.

From 1926 to 1928 Furlong served as executive officer of the battleship USS West Virginia, and then served as commander of the oiler USS Neches.  He also served as division commander of six destroyers in the Pacific.

From 1928 to 1931 he served as Chief of Policy and Liaison Section, Office of Island Government, Navy Department, Washington, D.C.

From 1931 to 1933 he commanded the light cruiser USS Marblehead.  He then served as inspector of ordnance in charge at the Naval Proving Ground in Dahlgren, Virginia, from 1933 to 1936.  On June 23, 1938, he was promoted to rear admiral and assigned as Chief of the Bureau of Ordnance for the Navy Department in Washington, D.C.

World War II
From February to December 1941, he served as commander of Minecraft, Battle Force at Pearl Harbor, Hawaii.  He present at the attack on Pearl Harbor on 7 December 1941, when he was on board his flagship, the minelayer USS Oglala, when it capsized after being strafed and torpedoed by the Japanese.

From December 12, 1941, to nearly the end of the war, he was commander of the Pearl Harbor Navy Yard and was charged with salvaging and repairing ships sunk during Japanese attack and returning them for use in the Pacific war.  Most notably, he oversaw the righting of the battleship USS Oklahoma which capsized after being torpedoed during the attack.

In 1944 he was awarded the Legion of Merit.  In 1945 he was awarded a Gold Star in lieu of second Legion of Merit.

Admiral Furlong retired from United States Navy on July 18, 1945, after 44 years of service.

Retirement
In retirement Furlong lived in Washington, D.C. and had a summer home in Roscoe, Pennsylvania. He was later decorated with Order of the Cross of Liberty, 1st Class by the Government of Finland as token of good will.

In 1949 Admiral Furlong was elected commander-in-chief of the Military Order of the World Wars.  He was also a member of the Naval Order of the United States (companion number 2459).  In 1949 he joined the District of Columbia Society of the Sons of the American Revolution and was assigned national membership number 71,282 and society number 2662.

In 1950 he was presented with the Freedoms Foundation award.

Admiral Furlong died on June 2, 1976, in Bethesda, Maryland.

In 1981 Furlong's book So Proudly We Hail: The History of the United States Flag was published by the Smithsonian Institution Press.

Legacy
The Admiral Furlong Award is awarded by the Sons of the American Revolution for the public display of the American flag by a non-governmental organization.

Awards
The ribbon bar of Rear Admiral William R. Furlong:

References

1881 births
1976 deaths
People from Huntingdon County, Pennsylvania
Attack on Pearl Harbor
Columbia School of Engineering and Applied Science alumni
United States Naval Academy alumni
United States Navy rear admirals
United States Navy personnel of World War I
United States Navy World War II admirals
Recipients of the Legion of Merit
Recipients of the Order of the Cross of Liberty, 1st Class
Burials at Arlington National Cemetery
Military personnel from Pennsylvania